Cottage Country is a 2013 Canadian comedy horror film directed by Peter Wellington. It stars Malin Åkerman, Tyler Labine, Dan Petronijevic and Lucy Punch. It was released on March 14, 2013. The film was produced by 	
Whizbang Films and Red Rock Entertainment.

Plot
Todd (Labine) wants everything to be perfect at his family cottage, where he plans to propose to Cammie (Åkerman). However, things go wrong when Todd's slacker brother, Salinger (Petronijevic), and his free-spirited girlfriend, Masha (Punch), show up. Todd accidentally kills his brother with an axe. After he confesses to Cammie, they devise a plan to kill Masha.

While she in the kitchen cooking mushrooms Masha turns around and catches Todd, who about to strike. Cammie quickly hits her with the frying pan and knocks her out. While lying on the floor, Masha begins to have a seizure. Cammie covers her face with the tarp and slams her head repeatedly against the floor. Todd and Cammie chop up the bodies and dispose of them in the lake on their way to the island. There, Todd proposes, and Cammie says yes.

On their way back to the mainland, they discover that Salinger invited many people to the cottage for a party and that they have arrived. During the party, one of Salinger's friends becomes very concerned about the disappearance of Masha and Salinger and catches Cammie in a lie. The friend then talks to Todd, who is very nervous, and tells him how much Salinger respects and loves him. He notices the cut above Todds head and starts asking him about it.

Todd's timeline fails to match up, but Cammie is determined not to let the murder stand in the way of their happiness.

Cast

References

External links

2013 films
English-language Canadian films
Canadian comedy horror films
2013 comedy horror films
Canadian slasher films
Films directed by Peter Wellington
Backwoods slasher films
2010s English-language films
2010s Canadian films